Pseudopharus gibeauxi is a moth in the family Erebidae first described by Hervé de Toulgoët in 1990. It is found in Venezuela.

References

Phaegopterina
Moths described in 1990